Mārtiņš Raitums (born 14 April 1985) is a Latvian ice hockey goaltender who participated at the 2010 IIHF World Championship as a member of the Latvia men's national ice hockey team. 
He is currently playing for Arystan Temirtau in the Kazakhstan Hockey Championship league.

References

External links
 

Arystan Temirtau players
Beibarys Atyrau players
EHC Bayreuth players
Latvian ice hockey goaltenders
People from Talsi
1985 births
Living people